Rizzuto is an Italian surname. Notable people with the surname include:

Phil Rizzuto (1917–2007), Major League Baseball player
Rizzuto crime family, an Italian-Canadian crime family
Nicolo Rizzuto (1924–2010), Italian-Canadian mobster
Vito Rizzuto (1946–2013), Italian-Canadian mobster
Angelo Rizzuto (1906–1967), American photographer
Garth Rizzuto (born 1947), retired National Hockey League player 
Nick Rizzuto (radio producer)
Pietro Rizzuto (1934–1997), Canadian politician

Italian-language surnames